Eastern Illinois University (EIU) is a public university in Charleston, Illinois. Established in 1895 as the Eastern Illinois State Normal School, a teacher's college offering a two-year degree, Eastern Illinois University gradually expanded into a comprehensive university with a broad curriculum, including bachelor's and master's degrees in education, business, arts, sciences, and humanities.

History
Eastern Illinois Normal School was established by the Illinois State Legislature in 1895 "to train teachers for the schools of East Central Illinois." A 40-acre campus was acquired in Charleston and the first building was commissioned. When the school began classes in 1899, there were 125 students and an 18-member faculty.

The first building was finished in 1899 and is called Old Main, though it is formally named the Livingston C. Lord Administration Building in honor of EIU's first president, who served from 1899 to 1933. Built of Indiana limestone in a heavy Gothic revival style with turrets, towers, and battlements, its distinctive outline is the official symbol of the school. Old Main is one of "Altgeld's castles", five buildings built in the 1890s at the major Illinois state colleges.  Governor John Peter Altgeld was instrumental in funding the Illinois university system, and he was especially fond of the Gothic style. Eastern's "Old Main"  and Illinois State University's Cook Hall are the only schools where the "castle" is not named after Altgeld. Other original Gothic Revival buildings include Booth Library and Blair Hall.  Blair Hall was restored after a disastrous fire in 2004. In fall 2008, the university opened the newly constructed Doudna Fine Arts Center,  designed by international architect Antoine Predock.  The  complex houses the music, theatre, and visual arts departments.

Through the twentieth century, the school changed its name several times in order to reflect its transition from a teachers college into a multi-purpose institution that could be of wider service to Illinois. Thus, Eastern Illinois State Normal School became Eastern Illinois State Teachers College in 1921, which then became Eastern Illinois State College in 1947. In 1957, the Illinois General Assembly changed the name of the institution to Eastern Illinois University.

Presidents

Samuel M. Inglis (appointed in 1898 but died before officially assuming office)
Livingston C. Lord (1899 to 1933)
Robert G. Buzzard (1933 to 1956)
Quincy Doudna (1956 to 1971)
Gilbert C. Fite (1971 to 1976)
Daniel E. Marvin (1977 to 1983)
Stanley G. Rives (1983 to 1992)
David L. Jorns (1992 to 1999)
Carol D. Surles (1999 to 2001)
Louis V. Hencken (2001 to 2007)
William L. Perry (2007 to 2015)
David M. Glassman (2017 to 2023)

Institution

Eastern Illinois University has roughly 8,600 students. Undergraduate admissions are selective. Tuition is approximately $8,880 per year for residents of Illinois and other bordering states, while it is $11,110 for non-residents. Additional fees amount to $2,923.48. The university estimates its average cost-of-attendance to be approximately $24,640 per academic year.

There are prominent Communication Disorders and Sciences and Biological Sciences programs, though the College of Education remains the largest department. The university has an endowment of approximately $82 million. The current president is David Glassman.

Rankings
In the U.S. News & World Report college rankings, EIU is classified as a regional public university and fits into one of four regions: the Midwest Region.  In the publication's 2019 rankings, EIU ranks No. 5 among its peers in that region. EIU's Business Program is ranked No. 405 as Best Undergraduate Business Programs.

Colleges and schools 
Eastern Illinois University is accredited by the Higher Learning Commission and the Council for the Accreditation of Educator Preparation. Eastern Illinois also offers 51 undergraduate degree programs; 32 graduate degree programs; and 10 post-baccalaureate certificate programs.

Eastern is divided into four colleges:

 College of Liberal Arts and Sciences
 Lumpkin College of Business and Technology
 College of Education
 College of Health and Human Services

Other academic divisions include The Graduate School, Sandra and Jack Pine Honors College, and the School of Extended Learning. The Graduate School was founded in 1951 and has an enrollment of approximately 1,800 full and part-time students with more than 300 faculty holding graduate faculty status. The university also includes the Center for Academic Support and Achievement, the Office of Inclusion and Academic Engagement, the Office of Research and Sponsored Programs, and the Office of Study Abroad.  The university's Booth Library hosts yearly exhibits, the Ballenger Teachers Center, and numerous digital collections.  The main university art museum, the Tarble Arts Center, maintains a 1,000-piece permanent collection, including a 500-piece collection of late 20th-century Illinois folk arts and related archival information. A majority of the holdings are concentrated on art from the state of Illinois and the Midwest region.

Eighty-eight percent of graduates find work in a field related to their major within six months after graduation.

Campus life

Organizations
Eastern Illinois University offers over 170 student organizations, ranging from religious, multicultural, service, academic, Greek, honorary, governing, social, athletic and political organizations.

Media

Newspaper
The school's daily newspaper is The Daily Eastern News, which was founded on November 5, 1915 and thus gives Eastern Illinois the distinction of being one of only three universities in the United States to run its own newspaper printing press; EIU is also one of the smallest universities in the country to have a daily newspaper.

Radio
Eastern Illinois also has a student-run radio station, Hit-Mix 88.9 WEIU, WEIU (FM). The radio station can be heard across Coles County and surrounding counties on 88.9 FM, as well as online through their website.

Television
WEIU-TV is a PBS station on the campus of Eastern Illinois University. WEIU-TV airs adult and kids PBS programming as well as a student-produced 30 minute nightly newscast. WEIU covers Champaign, Christian, Clark, Coles, Crawford, Cumberland, Douglas, Edgar, Effingham, Jasper, Macon, Moultrie, Piatt, Sangamon, Shelby, and Vermilion counties in Illinois and Vigo County in Indiana.

Residences
Eleven on-campus residence halls include seven co-ed, three female-only, and one male-only. Throughout the year the residence halls participate in competitions and various community service activities.
Andrews Hall (all female)
Powell-Norton Hall (formerly Douglas Hall, all male)
Ford Hall (co-ed)
Lawson Hall (co-ed)
Lincoln Hall (all female)
McKinney Hall (co-ed)
Pemberton Hall (all female)
Stevenson Hall (co-ed)
Taylor Hall (co-ed)
Thomas Hall (co-ed)
Weller Hall (co-ed)

Former residences 
Ruth Carman Hall was a former residence. It was named after Ruth Carman, an EIU alumni.

Carman Hall opened on September 4, 1970, but wasn't officially completed until November 14, 1971. Initially, the housing office was unable to fill the upper two floors of the building, but by 1977 the entire building was in use. From August 2011, only eight floors were occupied due to reduced enrollment. Carman Hall was closed after May 30, 2013, to allow for an assessment of the condition of the building and for future renovation. In 2014, the university stated that it would remain closed as a cost-saving measure due to low enrollment.

Since closure, the building has been used for training purposes by the Reserve Officers' Training Corps.

Dining services
Eastern Illinois University features three residence hall dining centers (Taylor, Thomas, and Stevenson), the University Food Court with five fast food locations, Java Beanery & Bakery (Java B & B), Chick-fil-A, Charleston Market, Panther Grille, Ace Sushi, and two Marketplace Convenience Centers. They also operate a restaurant-style option (Reservation-Only Dining) on the weekends.

Greek life
Fraternities on campus:

Alpha Phi Alpha
Lambda Chi Alpha
Omega Psi Phi
Sigma Alpha Epsilon
Sigma Phi Epsilon
Sigma Nu
Delta Chi

Fraternities with privately owned housing:

Pi Kappa Alpha
Sigma Pi
Sigma Chi
Phi Kappa Theta

Sororities on campus:

Alpha Gamma Delta
Alpha Phi
Alpha Sigma Alpha
Alpha Sigma Tau
Delta Delta Delta
Delta Sigma Theta
Delta Zeta
Kappa Delta
Sigma Gamma Rho
Sigma Kappa
Sigma Sigma Sigma
Zeta Phi Beta

Athletics

Eastern Illinois University's colors are blue and grey; the sports teams' mascot is the Panther. The teams participate in NCAA Division I (I-AA FCS for football) in the Ohio Valley Conference. The football team is coached by Chris Wilkerson and competes at home in O’Brien Field. Eastern Illinois University was a member of the Illinois Intercollegiate Athletic Conference from 1912 to 1970.

Current National Football League head coach, Sean Payton of the New Orleans Saints, is an alumnus of Eastern Illinois. Brad Childress, head coach of the Minnesota Vikings from 2006 to 2010, is also a graduate, preceding Sean Payton at Eastern Illinois. Additionally, Tony Romo, the former starting quarterback of the Dallas Cowboys, and Jimmy Garoppolo, starting quarterback of the San Francisco 49ers, are alumni of the university.

Eastern Illinois is also the host of the IHSA Boys and Girls State Track and Field Finals, which have been held at O'Brien Field since the 1970s. They also host the IHSA Girls State Badminton Finals and the State Journalism Finals.

Alma mater
Simply referred to as the "EIU Alma Mater," the song itself was composed by Friederich Koch during his tenure as a music teacher at Eastern. The lyrics were composed as a poem titled "For Us Arose Thy Walls and Towers" by Isabel McKinney, a professor of English at Eastern from 1911 to 1945. These lyrics were originally set to the German folk tune Die Wacht am Rhein (The Watch on the Rhine), but were changed around the time of World War I due to anti-German sentiments at the time.

Notable alumni

Authors
 Glen Gabbard, psychiatrist and author of 20 books
 Jan Spivey Gilchrist, children's book author and illustrator
 Lee Martin, novelist

Entertainment
 Joan Allen, actress 
 Burl Ives, singer/actor who has the Burl Ives Studio on campus named after him (dropped out his junior year)
 Gary Forrester, writer and composer
 Mike Genovese, actor
 Rob Kleiner, songwriter and producer
 John Malkovich, actor 
 Charlotte Martin, singer-songwriter
 LisaRaye McCoy, actress, notably from the sitcom All of Us 
 William Edward Phipps, actor
 Matthew Polenzani, opera singer
 Craig Titley, American film writer
 Jerry Van Dyke, actor
 Ron Westray, jazz trombonist, member of the Lincoln Center Jazz Orchestra and the Mingus Big Band

Politics
 Tim Butler, member of the Illinois House of Representatives
 Chuck Curran, member of the Ohio Senate from the 6th district from 1979 to 1982
 Jim Edgar, Governor of Illinois from 1991 to 1999 
 Joe Knollenberg, representative of the Ninth District of Michigan, United States House of Representatives from 1993 to 2009 
 Mary Miller, member of the United States House of Representatives
 Bill Mitchell, member of the Illinois House of Representatives
 Brandon Phelps, member of the Illinois House of Representatives
 Dennis Reboletti, member of Illinois House of Representatives 
Dale A. Righter - member of Illinois House of Representatives 1997-2003, Illinois State Senate 2003-2021
 Marilyn Skoglund B.A. 1971, Vermont Supreme Court Justice, notable for becoming lawyer and judge without attending law school
 Andy Skoog, member of the Illinois House of Representatives
 Larry Stuffle, member of the Illinois House of Representatives from 1977 to 1985. He was born in Charleston and represented the area in the Illinois House of Representatives.

Scientists
 Ronald W. Davis, biochemist and genetics researcher at Stanford's Genome Technology Center, with patents on over 30 biochemical devices.
 Darrell L. Judge (1934–2014), physicist and Fellow of the American Physical Society

Miscellaneous
 Christine Korsgaard, philosopher
 Jimmy John Liautaud, Founder of Jimmy Johns

Athletes

Athletics
 Dave Huxtable, analyst for the Texas Longhorns football team
 Ryan Pace, former general manager of NFL's Chicago Bears
 Dave Slifer, current head women's basketball coach for the Central Missouri Jennies basketball program
 Kirby Wilson, running backs coach for Las Vegas Raiders of the National Football League

Baseball
 Tim Bogar, retired Major League Baseball infielder 
Zach Borenstein, professional baseball player
Randy Myers, former American Major League Baseball pitcher with the New York Mets, Cincinnati Reds, San Diego Padres, Chicago Cubs, Baltimore Orioles and the Toronto Blue Jays between 1985 and 1998. 4x MLB All-Star.
 Marty Pattin, MLB All-Star pitcher 
 Stan Royer, MLB baseball player for the St. Louis Cardinals and Boston Red Sox 
 Kevin Seitzer, retired all-star Major League Baseball player

Basketball
 Henry Domercant, former professional basketball player in Europe
 Kevin Duckworth, former National Basketball Association all-star center 
 Kyle Hill, former professional basketball player
 Jay Taylor, former NBA player for the New Jersey Nets

Football
 Brad Childress, former head coach of the Minnesota Vikings of the National Football League 
 Ray Fisher, former lineman for Pittsburgh Steelers and Dallas Cowboys of the National Football League 
 Jimmy Garoppolo, quarterback for San Francisco 49ers
 Kamu Grugier-Hill, NFL linebacker for the Miami Dolphins
 Jeff Gossett, NFL Pro Bowl punter 
 Mike Heimerdinger, former NFL Offensive coordinator with the New York Jets, Denver Broncos and Tennessee Titans, died 2011 
 Alexander Hollins, wide receiver for the Minnesota Vikings
 Otis Hudson, NFL offensive lineman with the Cincinnati Bengals 
 John Jurkovic, former NFL defensive lineman 
 Tim Kelly offensive coordinator for the Houston Texans
 Ray McElroy, NFL defensive back for Chicago Bears, Indianapolis Colts and Detroit Lions
 Sean Payton, head coach of the Denver Broncos of the National Football League 
 Ted Petersen, former lineman for Pittsburgh Steelers, Cleveland Browns and Indianapolis Colts of the National Football League 
 Tony Romo, former quarterback of the Dallas Cowboys of the National Football League
 Mike Shanahan, former head coach of the Washington Redskins, Denver Broncos and Los Angeles Raiders of the National Football League
 Chris Szarka, fullback for the Saskatchewan Roughriders of the Canadian Football League 
 Pierre Walters, linebacker, Kansas City Chiefs, of the National Football League
 Chris Wilkerson, head coach of the University of Chicago Maroons football

Handball
 Tim Dykstra, former handball player who competed in the 1984 Summer Olympics.

MMA
 Brian Ebersole, Panther wrestler; professional MMA fighter formerly with the UFC
 Matt Hughes, NCAA All-American wrestler; retired professional MMA fighter, former 2-time UFC Welterweight Champion, UFC Hall of Fame member
 Kenny Robertson, four-time NCAA Division I qualifier for wrestling; professional mixed martial artist formerly with UFC and Bellator Fighting Championships
 Mike Russow, former wrestler; current mixed martial artist once for Pride Fighting Championships and the UFC
 Louis Taylor, wrestler; current professional MMA fighter
 Ryan Thomas, wrestler; current professional mixed martial arts fighter for American Top Team
 James Warring, boxing world champion, kickboxing world champion, boxing referee 
 Matt Veach, current mixed martial artist, formerly for the UFC

Rugby
Lauren Doyle, represented the United States of America for Rugby sevens at the 2016 Summer Olympics

Soccer
 John Baretta, former North American Soccer League goalkeeper
 Matt Bobo, former North American Soccer League player
 George Gorleku, former Major Indoor Soccer League (1978–92) player
 LeBaron Hollimon, former National Professional Soccer League (1984–2001) player
 Schellas Hyndman, former head coach of soccer's FC Dallas
 Damien Kelly, former National Professional Soccer League (1984–2001) player
 Mark Simpson, former goalkeeper and assistant coach for D.C. United
 Jason Thompson, former player for D.C. United
 Glen Tourville, former Major Indoor Soccer League (1978–92) player

Track
 John Craft, placed fifth in the Men's triple jump at the 1972 Summer Olympics
 Sandy Osei-Agyemang, advanced to the second round in the Men's 100 metres and Men's 4 × 100 metres relay at the 1972 Summer Olympics
 Dan Steele, track All-American, 400-meter national champion, and bronze medalist at the 2002 Salt Lake City Olympics
 Darrin Steele, competed at the 1998 Winter Olympics and the 2002 Winter Olympics

Tennis
 Quinn Camfield, former retired tennis player (2019-2021)

References

External links

 
 EIU Athletics website

 
State universities in Illinois
Public universities and colleges in Illinois
Educational institutions established in 1895
Education in Coles County, Illinois
Buildings and structures in Coles County, Illinois
Tourist attractions in Coles County, Illinois
1895 establishments in Illinois
Charleston, Illinois